Matsesta may refer to the following objects in Sochi:
Matsesta Microdistrict
Matsesta railway station
Matsesta (river)